Haydée Samama Chikly Tamzali (23 August 1906 – 20 August 1998) was a Tunisian actress, writer, and filmmaker.

Early life 
Haydée Chikly was born in 1906, the daughter of Tunisian Jewish filmmaker Albert Samama Chikly. Her mother was Bianca Ferrero, an Italian-born woman from Savoy. Tamzali's paternal grandfather, David Samama, was a banker of the Bey who established a banking institution that would later become the Bank of Tunisia.

Career 

Haydée Chikly worked with her father from girlhood. He directed her in her first starring role in a short film, Zohra (1922), written by her, and considered the first fiction film made in Tunisia. They followed this work with another silent drama in 1924, Ain el-Ghezal (The Girl from Carthage), also starring Haydée Chikly, in a story she wrote "to show how badly women were treated when they were just sold off with an arranged marriage into a man's world." The younger Chikly also took a turn at film editing and hand-coloring in her father's employ.

Haydée Chikly also appeared in Rex Ingram's The Arab (1924), but her father did not permit her to relocate to Hollywood to pursue an acting career.

In 1996, Haydée Tamzali appeared in the film A Summer in La Goulette, by Férid Boughedir.

Private life 
As an adult, Haydée Tamzali married, raised two children, lived in Algiers and Paris, and wrote a cookbook of North African cuisine, La Cuisine en Afrique du Nord.

In 1929, Haydée married the Algerian Khellil Tamzali and became Haydée Chikly Tamzali. She left Tunisia for Algeria where she continued to write. She was active in the civil society, becoming President of Social Works, Secretary of the Red Cross, and President of the League Against Cancer. She wrote many short stories and articles for the Tunisian national newspaper La Presse, as well a book in 1992 composed of true stories about the past called Lost Images.

Filmography 

 Zohra (1922)
 Aïn el Ghazal/La Fille de Carthage (1923)
 The Arab (1924)
 Un été à La Goulette (1996)

Works

Images retrouvées, 1992
La cuisine en Afrique du Nord : 444 recettes tunisiennes, algériennes et marocaines dont 33 couscous, 1999

References

External links 
 
 Profile of Haydée Chikly on Women Film Pioneers Project Website

1906 births
1998 deaths
Jewish Tunisian history
Tunisian people of Jewish descent
Converts to Islam from Judaism
Tunisian Muslims
Tunisian people of Italian descent
Tunisian expatriates in Algeria
Tunisian expatriates in France
Tunisian screenwriters
20th-century screenwriters
Women film pioneers